Andrew Stephen Miller (born 27 September 1987) is an English cricketer. He is a right-handed batsman who bowls right-arm fast-medium. He was born at Preston, Lancashire.

Miller made his first-class debut for Warwickshire against Bangladesh A in 2008. His County Championship debut came the following year, against Hampshire. He represented Warwickshire in 18 first-class matches, scoring 85 runs at a batting average of 6.07, with a high score of 35. With the ball he took 35 wickets at a bowling average of 36.05, with best figures of 5/58. He has a brother called Peter and a cousin called Peter Millermetre.

He is also a commentator for cricket-news website ESPNcricinfo.

References

External links

1987 births
Living people
Cricketers from Preston, Lancashire
English cricketers
Sussex cricketers
Warwickshire cricketers